The Wiener Börse AG (also known as the Vienna Stock Exchange) is a bourse situated in Vienna, Austria. The exchange also owns and operates the Prague Stock Exchange, and holds stakes in energy exchanges and clearing houses. It provides market infrastructure to other exchanges in Central, Eastern, and Southeastern Europe (Budapest, Zagreb, and Ljubljana), and collects and distributes stock market data and calculates the most important indices of the region. The Austrian Traded Index (ATX), the leading index of Wiener Börse, tracks the price of its blue chips in real time. The ATX composition is updated every March and September, mainly based on a stock's capitalized free float and trading volumes.

History
Wiener Börse is one of the world's oldest exchanges and was founded in 1771 during the reign of Empress Maria Theresa of Austria in order to provide a market for state issued bonds. She tried to rein in the illegal trade that took place in coffeeshops during that time. 

On 9 May 1879, the stock exchange crashed spectacularly ("Der Krach"), signalling the start of the Long Depression.

In 1985, Jim Rogers triggered a bull market when he said the Austrian capital market had high potential.

In 2019, it opened a multilateral trading facility (the exchange-regulated "Vienna MTF"), a Third market for over-the-counter transactions, mainly of foreign corporate bonds.

In 2020, the Vienna Stock Exchange decided to simplify its group structure. In order to reduce expenses and costs, Wiener Börse AG merged with the former group holding company CEESEG AG. The Prague Stock Exchange is now a 99.54% subsidiary of Wiener Börse AG.

On 1 September 2020, the Wiener Börse listed its first 21 titles denominated in cryptocurrencies like Bitcoin and Ethereum, including the services of real-time quotation and securities settlement.

See also
 Austrian Traded Index ATX
 List of European stock exchanges

References

External links 
 Homepage of Vienna Stock Exchange
 Information of Vienna Stock Exchange
 Vienna Stock Exchange Market Date

Financial services companies established in 1771
Companies based in Vienna
Financial services companies of Austria
Stock exchanges in Europe
1771 establishments in Europe
Theophil Hansen buildings
18th-century establishments in Austria